The ITS Cup is a tournament for professional female tennis players played on outdoor clay courts. The event is classified as a $60,000 ITF Women's Circuit tournament and has been held in Olomouc, Czech Republic, since 2009. The event had previously been a $100,000 tournament in 2012 and 2013. In 2019, it was downgraded to a $25,000 event.

Past finals

Singles

Doubles

External links 
 Official website 
 ITF search 

ITF Women's World Tennis Tour
Clay court tennis tournaments
Tennis tournaments in the Czech Republic
Recurring sporting events established in 2009